Brickellia parvula, the Mt. Davis brickellbush, is a North American species of flowering plants in the family Asteraceae. It is native to northeastern and north-central Mexico (Chihuahua) and the southwestern United States (southern New Mexico, southern Arizona, western Texas).

Brickellia parvula is a shrub up to 30 cm (12 inches) tall, growing from a woody caudex. It produces many small flower heads with yellow or green disc florets but no ray florets.

References

parvula
Flora of Chihuahua (state)
Flora of the Southwestern United States
Plants described in 1852